Transhumance is a type of pastoralism or nomadism, a seasonal movement of livestock between fixed summer and winter pastures. In montane regions (vertical transhumance), it implies movement between higher pastures in summer and lower valleys in winter. Herders have a permanent home, typically in valleys. Generally only the herds travel, with a certain number of people necessary to tend them, while the main population stays at the base. In contrast, horizontal transhumance is more susceptible to being disrupted by climatic, economic, or political change.

Traditional or fixed transhumance has occurred throughout the inhabited world, particularly Europe and western Asia. It is often important to pastoralist societies, as the dairy products of transhumance flocks and herds (milk, butter, yogurt and cheese) may form much of the diet of such populations. In many languages there are words for the higher summer pastures, and frequently these words have been used as place names: e.g. hafod in Wales and shieling in Scotland, or alp in German-speaking regions of Switzerland.

Etymology and definition 
The word transhumance comes from French and derives from the Latin words  'across' and  'ground'. Transhumance developed on every inhabited continent. Although there are substantial cultural and technological variations, the underlying practices for taking advantage of remote seasonal pastures are similar.

Transhumance is a "form of pastoralism or nomadism". Khazanov categorizes nomadic forms of pastoralism into five groups as follows: "pure pastoral nomadism", "semi-nomadic pastoralism", "semi-sedentary pastoralism", "distant-pastures husbandry" and "seasonal transhumance". Eickelman does not make a distinction between transhumant pastoralism and seminomadism, but he clearly distinguishes between nomadic pastoralism and seminomadism.

In prehistory 

Transhumance was practised in Europe in prehistoric times. Isotope studies of the bones of livestock show that animals were sometimes moved seasonally.
However it is a world-wide phenomenon. 

Hill people develop indigenous knowledge and must have survived over generations by acquiring sufficient skills to thrive in hill and mountain  regions. Most drovers are conversant with  subsistence agriculture,  Pastoralism as well as forestry and frozen water and fast-stream management There have been many prehistoric climate change events which impacted such cultures

Europe

Alps

Balkans 

In the Balkans, Albanians, Greek Sarakatsani, Eastern Romance (Romanians, Aromanians, Megleno-Romanians and Istro-Romanians) and Turkish Yörük peoples traditionally spent summer months in the mountains and returned to lower plains in the winter. When the area was part of the Austro-Hungary and Ottoman Empires, borders between Greece, Albania, Bulgaria and the former Yugoslavia were relatively unobstructed. In summer, some groups went as far north as the Balkan Mountains, and they would spend the winter on warmer plains in the vicinity of the Aegean Sea.

The Morlach or Karavlachs were a population of Eastern Romance shepherds ("ancestors" of the Istro-Romanians) who lived in the Dinaric Alps (western Balkans in modern use), constantly migrating in search of better pastures for their sheep flocks. But as national states appeared in the area of the former Ottoman Empire, new state borders were developed that divided the summer and winter habitats of many of the pastoral groups. These prevented easy movement across borders, particularly at times of war, which have been frequent.

Britain

Wales 

This system of transhumance has generally not been practised for almost a century; it continued in Snowdonia after it ceased elsewhere in Wales, and remnants of the practice can still be found in rural farming communities in the region to this day. Both "Hafod" and "Hendref" survive in Wales as place names and house names and in one case as the name of a raw milk cow cheese (Hafod). Today, cattle and sheep that summer on many hill farms are still transported to lowland winter pastures, but by truck rather than being driven overland.

Scotland 
Major drovers' roads in the eastern part of Scotland include the Cairnamounth, Elsick Mounth and Causey Mounth. This practice has largely stopped, but was practised within living memory in the Hebrides and in the Scottish Highlands. Today much transhumance is carried out by truck, with upland flocks being transported under agistment to lower-lying pasture during winter.

England 
Evidence exists of transhumance being practised in England since at least mediaeval times, from Cornwall in the south-west, through to the north of England. In the Lake District, hill sheep breeds, such as the Herdwick and Swaledale are moved between moor and valley in summer and winter respectively. This led to a trait and system known as hefting, whereby sheep and flock remain in the farmer's allotted area (heaf) of the commons, which is still practised. However, it is likely to have been undertaken on a much smaller scale than elsewhere in Europe.

Ireland 
In Ireland, transhumance is known as "booleying". These names survive in many place names such as Buaile h'Anraoi in Kilcommon parish, Erris, North Mayo, where the landscape still clearly shows the layout of the rundale system of agriculture. The livestock, usually cattle, was moved from a permanent lowland village to summer pastures in the mountains. The appearance of "Summerhill" in many place names also bears witness to the practice. This transfer alleviated pressure on the growing crops and provided fresh pasture for the livestock. Mentioned in the Brehon Laws, booleying dates back to the Early Medieval period or even earlier. The practice was widespread in the west of Ireland up until the time of the Second World War. Seasonal migration of workers to Scotland and England for the winter months superseded this ancient system, together with more permanent emigration to the USA.

Italy 

In Southern Italy, and especially in the regions of Molise, Apulia and Abruzzo, the practice of driving herds to upland pastures in summer dates from time immemorial and has had a long documented history until the 1950s and 1960s with the advent of alternative road transport. The tratturi remain public property and subject to conservation by the law protecting cultural heritage. The Molise region candidates the tratturi to the UNESCO as a world heritage.

Spain 

Transhumance is historically widespread throughout much of Spain, particularly in the regions of Castile, Leon and Extremadura, where nomadic cattle and sheep herders travel long distances in search of greener pastures in summer and warmer climatic conditions in winter. Spanish transhumance is the origin of numerous related cultures in the Americas such as the cowboys of the United States and the Gauchos of Argentina, Paraguay and Brazil.

The land within the droveways is publicly owned and protected by law.

In some high valleys of the Pyrenees and the Cantabrian Mountains, transhumant herding has been the main, or only, economic activity. Regulated passes and pasturage have been distributed among different valleys and communities according to the seasonal range of use and community jurisdiction. Unique social groups associated with the transhumant lifestyle are sometimes identified as a remnant of an older ethnic culture now surviving in isolated minorities, such as the "Pasiegos" in Cantabria, "Agotes" in Navarre, and "Vaqueiros de alzada" in Asturias and León.

The Pyrenees 

Transhumance in the Pyrenees involves relocation of livestock (cows, sheep, horses) to high mountains for summer months, because farms in the lowland are too small to support a larger herd all year round. The mountain period starts in late May or early June, and ends in early October. Until the 1970s, transhumance was used mainly for dairy cows, and cheese-making was an important activity in the summer months. In some regions, nearly all members of a family decamped to higher mountains with their cows, living in rudimentary stone cabins for the summer grazing season. That system, which evolved during the Middle Ages, lasted into the 20th century. It declined and broke down under pressure from industrialisation, as people left the countryside for jobs in cities. However, the importance of transhumance continues to be recognised through its celebration in popular festivals.

The Mont Perdu / Monte Perdido region of the Pyrenees has been designated as a UNESCO World Heritage Site by virtue of its association with the transhumance system of agriculture.

Scandinavian peninsula 

In Scandinavia, transhumance is practised to a certain extent; however, livestock are transported between pastures by motorised vehicles, changing the character of the movement. The Sami people practise transhumance with reindeer by a different system than is described immediately below.

The common mountain or forest pasture used for transhumance in summer is called  or  / . The same term is used for a related mountain cabin, which was used as a summer residence. In summer (usually late June), livestock is moved to a mountain farm, often quite distant from a home farm, to preserve meadows in valleys for producing hay. Livestock is typically tended during the summer by girls and younger women, who also milk and make cheese. Bulls usually remain at the home farm. As autumn approaches and grazing is exhausted, livestock is returned to the farm.

In Sweden, this system was predominantly used in Värmland, Dalarna, Härjedalen, Jämtland, Hälsingland, Medelpad and Ångermanland.

The practice was common throughout most of Norway, due to its highly mountainous nature and limited areas of lowland for cultivation. 

While previously many farms had their own seters, it is more usual for several farmers to share a modernised common seter. Most of the old seters have been left to decay or are used as recreational cabins.

The name for the common mountain pasture in most Scandinavian languages derives from the Old Norse term . Those names appear extensively across Sweden with a centre in the Mälaren basin and in Östergötland. The surname "Satter" is derived from these words.

Caucasus and northern Anatolia 

In the heavily forested Caucasus and Pontic mountain ranges, various peoples still practice transhumance to varying degrees. Traditionally, villages were divided into two, three or even four distinct settlements (one for each season) at different heights of a mountain slope. Much of this rural life came to an end during the first half of the 20th century, as the Kemalist and later Soviet governments tried to modernise the societies and stress urban development, rather than maintaining rural traditions.

In the second half of the 20th century, migration for work from the Pontic mountains to cities in Turkey and western Europe, and from the northern Caucasus to Moscow, dramatically reduced the number of people living in transhumance. It is estimated, however, that tens of thousands of rural people still practice these traditions in villages on the northern and southwestern slopes of the Caucasus, in the lesser Caucasus in Armenia, and in the Turkish Black Sea region.

Some communities continue to play out ancient migration patterns. For example, the Pontic Greeks visit the area and the monastery Sumela in the summer. Turks from cities in Europe have built a summer retreat on the former yayla grazing land.

Transhumance related to sheep farming is still practised in Georgia. Up until the dissolution of Soviet Union they intensively used the Kizlyar plains of Northern Dagestan for the same purpose.

Asia

Afghanistan 
The central Afghan highlands of Afghanistan, which surround the Koh-i-Baba and continue eastward into the Hindu Kush range, there are very cold winters, and short and cool summers. These highlands have mountain pastures during summer, watered by many small streams and rivers. There are also pastures available during winter in the neighboring warm lowlands, which makes the region ideal for seasonal transhumance. The Afghan Highlands contain about 225,000 km2 (87,000 sq mi) of summer pasture, which is used by both settled communities and nomadic pastoralists like the Pashtun Kuchis. Major pastures in the region include the Nawur pasture in northern Ghazni Province (whose area is about 600 km2 at elevation of up to 3,350 m), and the Shewa pasture and the Little Pamir in eastern Badakhshan Province. The Little Pamir pasture, whose elevation is above , is used by the Afghan Kyrgyz to raise livestock.

In Nuristan, the inhabitants live in permanent villages surrounded by arable fields on irrigated terraces. Most of the livestock are goats. They are taken up to a succession of summer pastures each spring by herdsmen while most of the villagers remain behind to irrigate the terraced fields and raise millet, maize, and wheat; work mostly done by the women. In the autumn after the grain and fruit harvest, livestock are brought back to spend the winter stall–fed in stables.

India 
Jammu and Kashmir in India has the world's highest transhumant population as per a survey conducted by a team led by Dr Shahid Iqbal Choudhary, IAS, Secretary to the Government of Jammu and Kashmir, Tribal Affairs Department. The 1st Survey of Transhumance in 2021 captured details of 6,12,000 members of ethnic tribal communities viz Gujjars, Bakkerwals, Gaddis and Sippis. The survey was carried out for development and welfare planning for these communities notified as Scheduled tribes under the Constitution of India. Subsequent to the survey a number of flagship initiatives were launched by the Government for their welfare and development especially in sectors like healthcare, veterinary services, education, livelihood and transportation support for migration. Transhumance in Jammu and Kashmir is mostly vertical while some families in the plains of the Jammu, Samba and Kathua districts also practice lateral or horizontal transhumance. More than 85% of the migratory transhumant population moves within the Union Territory of Jammu and Kashmir while the remaining 15% undertakes inter-state movement to the neighbouring Punjab State and to the Ladakh Union territory. Gujjars - a migratory tribe - also sparsely inhabit several areas in parts of Punjab, Himachal Pradesh and Uttarakhand. The Gujjar-Bakkerwal tribe represents the highest transhumant population in the world and accounts for nearly 98% of the transhumant population in Jammu and Kashmir. The Bhotiya communities of Uttarakhand historically practiced transhumance. They would spend the winter months at low altitude settlements in the Himalayan foothills, gathering resources to trade in Tibet over the summer. In the summer, they would move up to high-altitude settlements along various river valleys. Some people would remain at these settlements to cultivate farms; some would head to trade marts, crossing high mountain passes into western Tibet, while some others would practice nomadic pastoralism. This historic way of life came to an abrupt halt due to the closure of the Sino-Indian border following the Sino-Indian War of 1962. In the decades following this war, transhumance as a way of life rapidly declined among the Bhotiya people.

Iran 

The Bakhtiari tribe of Iran still practised this way of life in the mid-20th century. All along the Zagros Mountains from Azerbaijan to the Arabian Sea, pastoral tribes move back and forth with their herds annually according to the seasons, between their permanent homes in the valley and one in the foothills.

The Qashqai (Kashkai) are a Turkic tribe of southern Iran, who in the mid-20th century still practised transhumance. The tribe was said to have settled in ancient times in the Province of Fars, near the Persian Gulf, and by the mid-20th century lived beyond the Makran mountains.

In autumn the Kashkai broke camp, leaving the highlands to winter in warmer regions near Firuzabad, Kazerun, Jerrè, Farashband, on the banks of the Mond River. The migration was organised and controlled by the Kashkai Chief. The tribes avoided villages and towns, such as Shiraz and Isfahan, because their large flocks, numbering seven million head, could cause serious damage.

In the 1950s, the Kashkai tribes were estimated to number 400,000 people in total. There have been many social changes since that time.

Lebanon 

Examples of fixed transhumance are found in the North Governorate of Lebanon. Some settlements, like Ehden and Kfarsghab, are used during summer periods from the beginning of June until mid-October. The transhumance is motivated by agricultural activities (historically by the mulberry silkworm culture). The main crops in the coastal towns are olive, grape and citrus. For the mountain towns, the crops are summer fruits, mainly apples and pears. Other examples of transhumance exist in Lebanon.

Kyrgyzstan 

In Kyrgyzstan, transhumance practices, which never ceased during the Soviet period, have undergone a resurgence in the difficult economic times following independence in 1991. Transhumance is integral to Kyrgyz national culture. It is symbolised on their national flag. A tool used in its production is the namesake for Bishkek, the country's capital city.

Southeast and East Asia 
Transhumance practices are found in temperate areas, above ≈ in the Himalaya–Hindu Kush area (referred to below as Himalaya); and the cold semi-arid zone north of the Himalaya, through the Tibetan Plateau and northern China to the Eurasian Steppe.

Mongolia, China, Kazakhstan, Kyrgyzstan, Bhutan, India, Nepal and Pakistan all have vestigial transhumance cultures. The Bamar people of Myanmar were transhumance prior to their arrival to the region. In Mongolia, transhumance is used to avoid livestock losses during harsh winters, known as zuds. For regions of the Himalaya, transhumance still provides mainstay for several near-subsistence economiesfor example, that of Zanskar in northwest India, Van Gujjars and Bakarwals of Jammu and Kashmir in India, Kham Magar in western Nepal and Gaddis of Bharmaur region of Himachal Pradesh. In some cases, the distances travelled by the people with their livestock may be great enough to qualify as nomadic pastoralism.

Oceania

Australia 
In Australia, which has a large station (i.e., ranch) culture, stockmen provide the labour to move the herds to seasonal pastures.

Transhumant grazing is an important aspect of the cultural heritage of the Australian Alps, an area of which has been included on the Australian National Heritage List. Colonists started using this region for summer grazing in the 1830s, when pasture lower down was poor. The practice continued during the 19th and 20th centuries, helping make pastoralism in Australia viable. Transhumant grazing created a distinctive way of life that is an important part of Australia's pioneering history and culture. There are features in the area that are reminders of transhumant grazing, including abandoned stockman's huts, stock yards and stock routes.

Africa

North Africa 

The Berber people of North Africa were traditionally farmers, living in mountains relatively close to the Mediterranean coast, or oasis dwellers. However, the Tuareg and Zenaga of the southern Sahara practice nomadic transhumance. Other groups, such as the Chaouis, practised fixed transhumance.

Horn of Africa 
In rural areas, the Somali and Afar of Northeast Africa also traditionally practice nomadic transhumance. Their pastoralism is centred on camel husbandry, with additional sheep and goat herding.

The classic, "fixed" transhumance is practiced in the Ethiopian Highlands. During the cropping season the lands around the villages are not accessible for grazing. For instance, farmers with livestock in Dogu'a Tembien organise annual transhumance, particularly towards remote and vast grazing grounds, deep in valleys (where the grass grows early due to temperature) or mountain tops. Livestock will stay there overnight (transhumance) with children and a few adults keeping them.

 For instance, the cattle of Addi Geza'iti are brought every rainy season to the gorge of River Tsaliet that holds dense vegetation. The cattle keepers establish enclosures for the cattle and places for them to sleep, often in rock shelters. The cattle stay there until harvesting time, when they are needed for threshing, and when the stubble becomes available for grazing. Many cattle of Haddinnet and also Ayninbirkekin in Dogu'a Tembien are brought to the foot of the escarpment at Ab'aro. Cattle stay on there on wide rangelands. Some cattle keepers move far down to open woodland and establish their camp in large caves in sandstone.

East Africa 

The Pokot community are semi-nomadic pastoralists who are predominantly found in northwestern Kenya and Amudat district of Uganda. The community practices nomadic transhumance, with seasonal movement occurring between grasslands of Kenya (North Pokot sub-county) and Uganda (Amudat, Nakapiripirit and Moroto districts) (George Magak Oguna, 2014).

The Maasai are semi-nomadic people located primarily in Kenya and northern Tanzania who have transhumance cultures that revolve around their cattle.

Nigeria 
 
Fulani is the Hausa word for the pastoral peoples of Nigeria belonging to the Fulbe migratory ethnic group. The Fulani rear the majority of Nigeria's cattle, traditionally estimated at 83% pastoral, 17% village cattle and 0.3% peri-urban).

Cattle fulfil multiple roles in agro-pastoralist communities, providing meat, milk and draught power while sales of stock generate income and provide insurance against disasters. They also play a key role in status and prestige and for cementing social relationships such as kinship and marriage. For pastoralists, cattle represent the major household asset.

Pastoralism, as a livelihood, is coming under increased pressure across Africa, due to changing social, economic, political and environmental conditions. Prior to the 1950s, a symbiotic relationship existed between pastoralists, crop farmers and their environment with pastoralists practising transhumance. During the dry season, pastoralists migrated to the southern parts of the Guinea savannah zone, where there was ample pasture and a lower density of crop farmers. In the wet season, these areas faced high challenge from African animal trypanosomiasis transmitted by tsetse flies, so pastoralists would migrate to visit farmlands within the northern Sudan savannah zone, supplying dairy products to the local farming community. Reciprocally, the farming community supplied pastoralists with grain, and after the harvest, cattle were permitted to graze on crop residues in fields leaving behind valuable manure.

Angola 
In Southern Angola, several peoples, chiefly the Ovambo and part of the Nyaneka-Khumbi, have cultures that are entirely organised according to the practice of transhumance.

Lesotho 

The traditional economy of the Basotho in Lesotho is based on rearing cattle. They practise a seasonal migration between valley and high plateaus of the Maloti (basalt mountains of Lesotho). Pressure on pasture land has increased due to increases in population, as well as construction of large storage dams in these mountains to provide water to South Africa's arid industrial heartland. Growing pressure on pastures is contributing to degradation of sensitive grasslands and could contribute to sedimentation in man-made lakes. The traditional transhumance pattern has become modified.

South Africa 
In South Africa the transhumance lifestyle of the Nama clan of the Khoikhoi continues in the Richtersveld, a montane-desert located close to the Atlantic coast in the northwestern area of the country. In this area, people move seasonally (three or four times per annum) with their herds of sheep and goats. Transhumance is based on small family units, which use the same camps each year.

These dwellings are used in their seasonal camps in the Richtersveld. It consists of a frame traditionally covered with rush mats. In the 21st century, the people sometimes use a variety of manufactured materials. In recognition of its significance, the Richtersveld has been designated as a UNESCO World Heritage Site.

North America 
In the southern Appalachians of the United States in the 19th and early 20th centuries, settlers often pastured livestock, especially sheep, on grassy bald mountain tops where wild oats predominate. Historians have speculated that these "balds" are remnants of ancient bison grazing lands (which were possibly maintained by early native peoples of North America). In the absence of transhumance, these balds have been becoming covered by forest since the late 20th century. It is unclear whether efforts will be made to preserve these historic managed ecosystems.

Transhumance, in most cases relying on use of public land, continues to be an important ranching practice in the western United States. In the northern areas, this tradition was based on moving herds to higher ground with the greening of highland pastures in spring and summer. These uplands are part of large public lands, often under the jurisdiction of the United States Forest Service. In the winter, herds use lowland steppe or desert, also often government land under the jurisdiction of the Bureau of Land Management.

In California and Texas, a greater proportion of the range is held as private land, due to differing historical development of these areas. The general pattern is that in summer, ranch families, hired shepherds, or hired cowboys travel to the mountains and stay in a line camp during the summer. They may also visit the upland ranch regularly, using trailers to transport horses for use in the high country.

Traditionally in the American West, shepherds spent most of the year with a sheep herd, searching for the best forage in each season. This type of shepherding peaked in the late nineteenth century. Cattle and sheep herds are generally based on private land, although this may be a small part of the total range when all seasons are included. Some farmers who raised sheep recruited Basque shepherds to care for the herds, including managing migration between grazing lands. Workers from Peru, Chile (often Native Americans), and Mongolia have now taken shepherd roles; the Basque have bought their own ranches or moved to urban jobs. Shepherds take the sheep into the mountains in the summer (documented in the 2009 film Sweetgrass) and out on the desert in the winter, at times using crop stubble and pasture on private land when it is available. There are a number of different forms of transhumance in the United States:

The Navajo began practicing transhumance in the 1850s, after they were forced out of their traditional homeland in the San Juan River valley. They maintain many sheep.

In California, the home ranch tends to have more private land, largely because of the legacy of the Spanish land grant system. For this reason, extensive acreages of Mediterranean oak woodlands and grasslands are stewarded by ranches whose economy depends on summer range on government land under the jurisdiction of the U.S. Forest Service.

South America 

Transhumance is currently practised at least in Argentina, Chile, Peru and Bolivia, as well as in the Brazilian Pantanal. It mainly involves movement of cattle in the Pantanal and in parts of Argentina. In the Altiplano, communities of indigenous people depend on raising camelids, especially llamas. Herds of goats are managed by transhumance in North Neuquén and South Mendoza, while sheep are more used in the Patagonian plains. Criollos and indigenous peoples use transhumant practices in areas of South America.

See also 
 Altitudinal migration
 Kuchis
 Rarámuri
 Sarakatsani
 Seasonal human migration
 Yaylak

Sources 
 Jones, Schuyler. "Transhumance Reconsidered". Journal of the Royal Anthropological Institute, London, 2005.
 Costello, Eugene & Svensson, Eva (eds.). Historical Archaeologies Of Transhumance Across Europe Routledge, London, 2018.
 Jones, Schuyler. Men of Influence: Social Control & Dispute Settlement in Waigal Valley, Afghanistan. Seminar Press, London & New York, 1974.

References

External links 

 U.S. Department of Agriculture Discussion on Asia
 U.S. Department of Agriculture Discussion on Africa
 Transhumance and 'The Waiting Zone' in North Africa
 Limited traditional transhumance in Australia
 Pastoralism
 Short mention of transhumance in North America
 Swiss land registry of alpine pastures (German)
 La transhumancia in Madrid Spain
 The transhumance from Schnals Valley (Italy) to Ötz Valley (Austria)
 Interview with Lionel Martorell, one of the last transhumant pastors in Eastern Spain